Morin is a surname of diffent Romance origins. In northern Italy it derives from the Ladin term for «mill» (molina in Latin). In French it derives from the ancient Celtic tribe of Morini who once inhabited the coast of modern day Belgium. The Gaulish ethnonym Morini (sing. Morinos) literally means 'those of the sea', that is to say the 'sea people' or the 'sailors'. It stems from Proto-Celtic *mori 'sea'. 
It may also refer to:

 Morin, flavonol and yellow chemical compound.

People

Canada
 Albertine Morin-Labrecque (1886–1957) Canadian pianist
 Augustin-Norbert Morin (1803–1865), lawyer, judge and politician, joint Premier of the Province of Canada
 Blain Morin, Canadian politician and labour union organizer
 Claude Morin (ADQ politician) (born 1953), Canadian politician
 Claude Morin (PQ politician) (born 1929), Canadian politician
 Gilles Morin (born 1931), Canadian politician in Ontario
 Guy Paul Morin, Canadian wrongfully convicted of a 1984 murder
 Jacques-Yvan Morin (born 1931), Canadian politician in Quebec
 Jean-Baptiste Morin (politician) (1840–1911), Canadian politician
 Karl Morin-Strom (also Karl Strom) (born 1952), Canadian politician in Ontario
 Marie-Eve Morin, Canadian philosopher
 Marie-Lucie Morin, Canadian public official and diplomat
 Pat Morin, Canadian computer scientist
 Pete Morin (1915–2000), Canadian hockey player
 Randy Charles Morin (born 1969), Canadian author and blogger
 René Morin (1883–1955), head of the Canadian Broadcasting Corporation during World War II
 Robert Morin (born 1949), Canadian film director
 Samuel Morin (born 1995), Canadian ice hockey player
 Victor Morin, inventor of the Morin code, a parliamentary authority used mainly in Quebec

France
 Arthur Morin (1795–1880), French physicist
 Bernard Morin (1931–2018), French mathematician, especially a topologist
 Edgar Morin (also Edgar Nahoum) (born 1921), French philosopher and sociobiologist
 Hervé Morin (born 1961), Minister of Defence of France
 Jean Morin (artist) (c.1595 or 1605–1650), French baroque artist 
 Jean Morin (theologian) (also Joannes Morinus) (1591–1659), French theologian and biblical scholar
 Jean-Baptiste Morin (composer) (1677–1745), French composer
 Jean-Baptiste Morin (mathematician) (also Morinus) (1583–1656), French mathematician, astrologer and astronomer

Italy
Enrico Morin (1841–1910), Italian admiral and politician

Sweden
 Linus Morin (born 1987), Swedish ice hockey player

United Kingdom
 Charles Morin, nom de plume used by Winston Churchill
 Nea Morin (1905–1986), British rock climber

United States
 Brent Morin, American comedian, stand-up comic and actor
 Henry Louis Morin (1899-1949), American farmer, labor union activist, and politician
 Jeremy Morin, American ice hockey player
 John M. Morin (1868–1942), American congressman from Pennsylvania
 Lee Morin (born 1952), American NASA astronaut
 Mike Morin (born 1991), American baseball player
 Parker Morin (born 1991), American baseball coach
 Robert E. Morin, chief judge of the Superior Court of the District of Columbia
 Roger Morin (1941–2019), American Roman Catholic bishop 
 William H. Morin, American soldier awarded Medal of Honor

Notes and references 
Morin-Heights

See also 
 Moran (disambiguation)
 Morini (disambiguation)
 Morrin (disambiguation)

French-language surnames
Italian-language surnames